The Oklahoma State Fair is a fair and exposition in Oklahoma City, Oklahoma. It takes place in mid-September each year, and along with the Tulsa State Fair it is one of two state fairs in Oklahoma. During the eleven-day run, the Oklahoma State Fair attracts close to one million people.  The fairgrounds also holds horse shows and rodeos.

The Fair was not held in 1917, 1918, 1945, and 2020. 

The fair was held for reasons of "morale" and patriotic and educational displays during WWII except 1945. 

Fair patrollers include security guards, the Oklahoma City Police and Oklahoma County Sheriff's Office.

See also 
 Jim Norick Arena (formerly Fairgrounds Arena)
 Ulmus parvifolia 'State Fair'

References

External links
 
 

State fairs
Annual fairs
Economy of Oklahoma City
Fairs in the United States
Tourist attractions in Oklahoma City
Festivals established in 1907
1907 establishments in Oklahoma
Fairs in Oklahoma